From a Distance may refer to:

"From a Distance", song by Julie Gold, made famous by Nanci Griffith and Bette Midler
"From a Distance", song by P. F. Sloan
From a Distance: The Very Best of Nanci Griffith, album by Nanci Griffith
From a Distance: The Event, album by Cliff Richard
From a Distance (Elaine Paige album), album by Elaine Paige

see also
Death from a Distance, 1935 American film directed by Frank R. Strayer
"Touching from a Distance, biography by Deborah Curtis about Ian Curtis, lead singer of Joy Division